Wolf Blood is a 1995 Russian action film directed by Nikolai Stambula.

Plot 
The film takes place during the split of the country. Bandits rob and kill villagers, escalating fear everywhere. The detachment of Rodion Dobrykh is trying to fight back.

Cast 
 Yevgeny Sidikhin as Rodion Dobrykh
 Aleksandr Kazakov
 Regimantas Adomaitis
 Liubomiras Laucevicius
 Sergey Garmash
 Vladimir Kashpur
 Natalya Egorova
 Alina Tarkinskaya	
 Viktor Stepanov
 Yelena Pavlichenko

References

External links 
 

1995 films
1995 Western (genre) films
1990s Russian-language films
Russian action films
1995 action films